Masters W40 javelin world record progression is the progression of world record improvements of the javelin throw W40 division of Masters athletics.  Records must be conducted appropriately, with official competitions under the standing IAAF rules unless modified by World Masters Athletics.

The W40 division consists of female athletes. These athletes have reached the age of 40 but have not yet reached the age of 45. The W40 division athletes throw the same 600g javelin as the Open division.  The competitors all threw their records in open competition.

Key

Old javelin

References

Masters Athletics Javelin list

Masters athletics world record progressions
Javelin